Trgovišče is a settlement on the left bank of the Drava River on the road from Ptuj to Ormož in the Municipality of Ormož  in northeastern Slovenia. Although the main core of the settlement is built on and around the main road, its territory extends south towards the Drava, right to the border with Croatia. The area belongs to the traditional region of Styria. It is now included in the Drava Statistical Region.

References

External links
Trgovišče on Geopedia

Populated places in the Municipality of Ormož